The 1927 Mississippi A&M Aggies football team represented The Agricultural and Mechanical College of the State of Mississippi (now known as Mississippi State University) as a member of the Southern Conference (SoCon) during the 1927 college football season. Led by first-year head coach John W. Hancock, the Aggies played their home games at Scott Field in Starkville, Mississippi. Mississippi A&M finished the season with an overall record of 5–3 and a mark of 2–3 in conference play.

Schedule

References

Mississippi AandM
Mississippi State Bulldogs football seasons
Mississippi AandM Aggies football